Edward Baer Roberts (born 1935) is a faculty member at the MIT Sloan School of Management. He became the David Sarnoff Professor of Management of Technology in 1974.

Ed Roberts, one of the leading authorities on entrepreneurship wrote "Entrepreneurs in High Technology: Lessons from MIT and Beyond" on high-tech business creation and growth. The book  won the Association of American Publishers Award for Outstanding Book in Business and Management in 1991. Dr. Roberts is the David Sarnoff Professor of Management of Technology at the Massachusetts Institute of Technology, the Chair of the Sloan School’s Management of Technological Innovation & Entrepreneurship research and education programs, as well as the founder and chair of the MIT Entrepreneurship Center.

Dr. Roberts has been a co-founder, director, and/or angel investor in many emerging companies. He co-founded and for 20 years was a General Partner in the Zero Stage and First Stage Capital Equity Funds, venture capital funds specializing in early-stage technology firms. He co-founded and was CEO of Pugh-Roberts Associates, an international management consulting firm specializing in strategic planning and technology management (now a division of PA Consulting Group). He also co-founded and serves as a Director of Sohu.com, a leading Chinese Internet firm.

He earned Bachelor’s and Master’s degrees in Engineering, an MBA, and the world’s first Ph.D. in System Dynamics, all from MIT. He has authored more than 150 articles and 11 books, most recently Innovation: Driving Product, Process and Market Change.

Professor Roberts serves on the board of advisors of Maverick Ventures Israel, a unique venture capital fund composed of private investors which invests in early growth Israeli startups.

In 1996 he helped Charles Zhang found the company ITC, which later became Sohu, one of China's biggest Internet companies.

References 

Living people
1935 births
MIT School of Engineering alumni
MIT Sloan School of Management alumni
American businesspeople
MIT Sloan School of Management faculty